Solon T. Williams (October 4, 1860 – January 3, 1945) was an American politician in the state of Washington. He served in the Washington House of Representatives from 1895 to 1899.

References

Republican Party members of the Washington House of Representatives
1860 births
1945 deaths
People from Lawrence, Kansas